Oldřich Pelčák (born November 2, 1943, in Zlín, Czechoslovakia) was a Czech cosmonaut and engineer. He graduated from Gagarin Air Force Military Academy. In 1976, Pelčák was selected as backup of Vladimír Remek for the Soyuz 28 mission. They were the first cosmonauts who were neither Americans nor Soviets.

References

External links 
 Čtvrtstoletí po letu Vladimír Remka (Czech Radio)

1943 births
Living people
People from Zlín
Czechoslovak cosmonauts
Czechoslovak Air Force officers
Czech cosmonauts and astronauts